Business & Finance (sometimes B&F) is an Irish business magazine published by Catalyst Media, that was established by Hugh McLaughlin in September 1964. It provides news, comment, and analysis on Irish and international news stories. The readership consists of business professionals, including senior level business leaders such as CEOs and heads of functions. It was a sister title to investigative news magazine Magill, which closed in 2009.

History and circulation
The magazine has been published continually since its foundation in 1964. At the beginning of the 2000s the magazine was published on a weekly basis. The parent company was Belenos Publications, which acquired the magazine in 2001. It is currently published by Catalyst Media, owners of Dublin Tech Summit.

From 2008 to 2012, Business & Finance was edited by John Walsh, who took over after the departure of controversial economist Constantin Gurdgiev. Under Walsh's tenure, contributors included Richard Delevan, Gavin Miller, Nicole Matthews, Sarah Gilmartin and teic.ie editor Adam Maguire.

The magazine claimed a readership of over 55,100 and a bi-weekly circulation, according to an ABC circulated audit, of 15,767 for the period 1 July to 31 December 2008.

Other titles
Also published are the annual "Top 1000 Companies in Ireland" and the "Who's Who in Irish Business". Other publications include the Life Sciences Review for news and updates for the life sciences industry in Ireland and Green Business which focuses on the implications of the move to 'green' for the business community.

Other company operations
Business & Finance Media Group have an Events Division, which manages several awards and events including the Business & Finance US Business Awards, Business & Finance Awards, Golden Spider Awards, the International Financial Services Summit. In 2009 it also launched the inaugural Business & Finance Asia Pacific/Ireland awards. Also in the portfolio is the Top 1000 Companies in Ireland Database and a real-time online news portal.

Controversy
Moranna Ltd., the company previously publishing Business & Finance, folded in early 2011 owing more than €500,000. A new debt-free company was then established to continue publishing the magazine.

Notes

References
 Business & Finance Periodical Publishers Association of Ireland

External links
 Business & Finance Official site
 Business & Finance Asia Pacific/Ireland Awards

Business magazines
Magazines published in Ireland
Magazines established in 1964
Biweekly magazines
Weekly magazines published in Ireland